Chamindu Wickramasinghe (born 6 September 2002) is a Sri Lankan cricketer. He made his Twenty20 debut on 4 March 2021, for Sinhalese Sports Club in the 2020–21 SLC Twenty20 Tournament.

References

External links
 

2002 births
Living people
Sri Lankan cricketers
Sinhalese Sports Club cricketers
Place of birth missing (living people)